Thomas F. "Tom" Barraga (born April 23, 1943) is a member of the Suffolk County Legislature in New York, representing the 11th Legislative District, which includes West Islip, Bay Shore, Fire Island, and parts of Brentwood. He was a member of the New York State Assembly for 23 years.

Biography
Barraga was raised on Long Island, attended St. Joseph's Elementary School in Babylon and graduated from St. Anthony's High School in Smithtown. He received a BBA degree in marketing from St. John's University in 1964. Barraga served six years in the U.S. Marine Corps Reserve, receiving an honorable discharge in 1966. He earned an M.B.A. from Long Island University in 1972 and a Ph.D as a Doctorate of Philosophy, Business and Public Administration from Columbia Pacific University in 1981.

Barraga began working in the private sector, and held positions with the American Can Company, Dun and Bradstreet, and Pfizer. He entered politics in 1977, serving as Town Clerk for the Town of Islip. He was a member of the New York State Assembly from 1983 to 2005, sitting in the 185th, 186th, 187th, 188th, 189th, 190th, 191st, 192nd, 193rd, 194th, 195th and 196th New York State Legislatures. On November 8, 2005, he was elected in the 11th Legislative District to the Suffolk County Legislature.

Barraga resides in West Islip. He and his wife Joanne (née Kurtz) have two daughters. He is a member of Our Lady of Lourdes Roman Catholic Church in West Islip, the Sons of Italy, and the American Legion. He used to be vice-chairman of the board of trustees at Suffolk Community College.

Controversy 
On January 29, 2014, Barraga wrote a letter to a young constituent whose mother was struck by a car that made an illegal left-turn, seriously injuring her, while she was riding a bicycle in Babylon. Barraga advised that he felt, "no one... who lives in Suffolk County should ever ride a bicycle or motorcycle."  Barraga wrote that additional signage and/or bike lanes would do little to solve the problem, as motorists would ignore signs. "Reality at times can be difficult for some to come to grips with but giving false hope would be inappropriate."

References

1943 births
Living people
County legislators in New York (state)
Republican Party members of the New York State Assembly
Politicians from Suffolk County, New York
St. John's University (New York City) alumni
Long Island University alumni
Columbia Pacific University alumni